A PrintableString is a restricted character string type in the ASN.1 notation.
It is used to describe data that consists only of a specific printable subset of the ASCII character set.

According to the ASN.1 Specification of basic notation, the character set of PrintableString can be expressed as:

The PrintableString definition does not include the at sign (@) or ampersand (&).
This sometimes causes problems for naive implementers who attempt to put an SMTP email address into an X.509 digital certificate Distinguished Name.

The PrintableString definition does not include asterisk (*) which means it must not be used to represent a wildcard in an X.509 digital certificate Distinguished Name.

See also 
 The X.690 encoding standard for ASN.1
 IA5String

References 

Character sets